Todd Christopher Young (born August 24, 1972) is an American attorney and politician serving as the senior United States senator for Indiana, a seat he has held since 2017. He was elected to the United States Senate in the November 8, 2016, general election, succeeding retiring Republican Dan Coats. From 2019 to 2021, he served as the chair of the National Republican Senatorial Committee. Young was reelected in 2022.

Early life and education
Young was born August 24, 1972, in Lancaster, Pennsylvania, the second of three children of Nancy R. (née Pierce) and Bruce H. Young. He lived in Marion County, Indiana, for several years before settling in Hamilton County, Indiana, where he attended public schools and won a state soccer championship. In 1990, Young graduated from Carmel High School in Carmel, Indiana.

Military career
After graduating from high school, Young enlisted in the United States Navy and reported for duty in Newport, Rhode Island. In May 1991, he received an appointment from the Secretary of the Navy to attend the United States Naval Academy in Annapolis, Maryland, where his classmates elected him a class officer and he earned a varsity letter as a member of Navy's NCAA Division I soccer team. He graduated cum laude in 1995, earning a B.S. in political science, and accepted a commission in the U.S. Marine Corps.

Upon graduating from Annapolis, Young trained for six months at the Basic School in Quantico, Virginia. In 1996, he completed the Naval Intelligence Officer Basic Course in Dam Neck, Virginia. Young then led the intelligence department of VMU-2, an unmanned aerial vehicle squadron based in Cherry Point, North Carolina. In 2000 while stationed in the Chicago area, Young earned an MBA from the University of Chicago Graduate School of Business.

Post-military career
Young was honorably discharged from active duty in 2000 as a U.S. Marine Captain. After leaving active duty, Young spent a year in London, attending the University of London's Institute of United States Studies. After writing a thesis on the economic history of Midwestern agriculture, in 2001 Young received his MA in American politics.

In the summer of 2001, Young traveled to former Communist countries in Eastern Europe where he studied the transition from centrally planned economies to free markets through an executive education program with the Leipzig Graduate School of Management, the first private business school in eastern Germany. He worked as an adjunct professor of public affairs at Indiana University's School of Public and Environmental Affairs and attended law school at night. In 2004, he joined Indiana-based Crowe Chizek and Company as a management consultant, helping state and local government clients improve service delivery to Indiana citizens.

In 2006, Young earned his J.D. from the Indiana University Robert H. McKinney School of Law, where he was President of the school's Federalist Society chapter. Upon graduation he joined the Paoli, Indiana-based firm Tucker and Tucker, P.C. Young is a member of the 2007 class of the Indiana Leadership Forum.

Early political career
In 2001, he moved to Washington, D.C., where he briefly worked at The Heritage Foundation, a conservative think tank. Then he became a staffer for U.S. senator Richard Lugar. In 2003, Young volunteered for Mitch Daniels's campaign for governor of Indiana. He was a delegate to the Indiana Republican state convention. From 2007 to 2010, Young served as Assistant Deputy Prosecutor for Orange County, Indiana. In 2007, Young founded a fiscal responsibility advocacy group, the National Organization for People vs. Irresponsible Government Spending.

U.S. House of Representatives

Elections

2010 

On January 26, 2009, Young announced that he would run for the United States congressional seat in Indiana's 9th district as a Republican.

Young competed with fellow Republicans Mike Sodrel and Travis Hankins for the party's nomination for Congress and won, challenging incumbent Democrat Baron Hill in the general election. Young received endorsements from former Vice President Dan Quayle as well as Lieutenant Governor Becky Skillman, Attorney General Greg Zoeller, Secretary of State Todd Rokita, Auditor Tim Berry, and Treasurer Richard Mourdock.

Young won the primary and general elections, defeating incumbent Baron Hill on November 2, 2010, and was seated in the 112th Congress in January 2011.

2012 

Young defeated Shelli Yoder, winning 55% of the vote in the newly redrawn 9th district.

2014 

Young defeated Bill Bailey, winning 62% of the vote.

Tenure

Young is a member of the Republican Main Street Partnership along with three other Republican senators. The Main Street Partnership is considered to be an association of moderate Republicans. In 2013 the National Journal gave Young an overall composite rating of 69% conservative and 31% liberal, an economic rating of 69% conservative and 30% liberal, a social rating of 57% conservative and 42% liberal, and a foreign policy rating of 77% conservative and 15% liberal.

2010s
In the 112th Congress, Young voted with the Republican Party 95% of the time. During the 113th Congress, the Human Rights Campaign, which rates politicians' support for LGBT issues, rated Young 30%, indicating a mixed record. In July 2012, Young took over as the lead sponsor of the REINS Act, a bill that passed the House in 2011 and would require congressional approval for rules with greater than $100 million in economic impact.

In the 112th Congress, Young was a member of the House Budget Committee and the House Armed Services Committee. On the latter, he focused on seapower, electronic warfare, and military grand strategy of the United States. During the first session of the 112th Congress, he employed one of the German Marshall Fund's Congressional Fellows as military legislative aide.

In 2010, Young stated that he was uncertain what was causing the observed heating of the planet, that it could be sunspots or normal cycles of nature, and that "the science is not settled." That same year he signed a pledge sponsored by Americans for Prosperity promising to vote against any global warming legislation that would raise taxes.

In 2011, he voted for the Energy Tax Prevention Act of 2011. In 2014, he said that it is "not necessarily the case" that there is a scientific consensus on climate change.

Sponsored legislation
 Fairness for American Families Act – Introduced by Young on July 11, 2013, this bill would "amend the Internal Revenue Code, as amended by the Patient Protection and Affordable Care Act, to delay until 2015 the requirement that individuals maintain minimal essential health care coverage." The bill was proposed in response to a July 2, 2013, decision by the Obama Administration to delay the employer mandate found in the Patient Protection and Affordable Care Act, but do nothing to the individual mandate requirement.

When he introduced the Fairness for American Families Act, Young argued that "rather than driving healthcare costs down, the individual mandate is imposing a new tax and burdensome costs on middle class families" and therefore "hardworking Americans deserve the same exemptions that President Obama is unilaterally granting to businesses and labor unions."

 Save American Workers Act of 2013 – a bill to amend the way in which the Patient Protection and Affordable Care Act (popularly known as Obamacare) defines full-time worker by raising the 30-hour threshold to 40 hours a week, in an effort to remove the incentive some companies may have to reduce their employees' hours to avoid the employer healthcare mandate. Young introduced it into the House on June 28, 2013.

Committee assignments
Senate Committee on Foreign Relations
 Chair, Subcommittee on Multilateral International Development, Multilateral Institutions, and International Economic, Energy, and Environmental Policy
 Member, Subcommittee on Africa and Global Health Policy
 Member, Subcommittee on Near East, South Asia, Central Asia, and Counterterrorism
 Senate Committee on Commerce, Science, and Transportation
 Member, Subcommittee on Communications, Technology, Innovation, and the Internet
 Member, Subcommittee on Manufacturing, Trade, and Consumer Protection
 Member, Subcommittee on Transportation and Safety
 Senate Committee on Finance
 Member, Subcommittee on Health Care
 Member, Subcommittee on International Trade, Customs, and Global Competitiveness
 Member, Subcommittee on Social Security, Pensions, and Family Policy
 Senate Committee on Small Business and Entrepreneurship 
Caucus Memberships
Congressional Cement Caucus
Congressional German-American Caucus

U.S. Senate

Elections

2016 

Rather than run for reelection to the House, Young announced his candidacy for the Republican nomination in the 2016 election to fill the Senate seat of the retiring Dan Coats. Also filing for the Republican primary was U.S. Representative Marlin Stutzman. Although Young was certified as having submitted enough signatures to qualify for the primary ballot, that official certification was challenged, and a tally by the Associated Press concluded that Young had fallen short. The state Election Commission scheduled a hearing on the challenge for February 19, 2016. The commission voted down the challenge with a 2–2 vote and Young remained on the ballot.

Young easily defeated Stutzman in the May 3 primary, taking 67% of approximately one million votes cast. He was initially slated to face former U.S. Representative Baron Hill, whom Young had defeated in 2010 to win his congressional seat, but on July 11, Hill announced he was dropping out of the Senate race. Hill was replaced by Evan Bayh, who had held the seat from 1999 to 2011. Young defeated Bayh in the November 8 general election, winning 52% of the vote to Bayh's 42%.

2022 

Young won re-election to a second term in 2022, defeating Democratic nominee Thomas McDermott Jr. 58.6% to 37.9%.

Tenure
On January 3, 2017, Young was sworn into the United States Senate in the 115th Congress by Vice President Joe Biden. Young was ranked the ninth most bipartisan Senator in the first session of the 115th Congress by the Bipartisan Index, a metric created by the Lugar Center and Georgetown's McCourt School of Public Policy to assess congressional bipartisanship. GovTrack noted that during the same period, Young joined more bipartisan bills than any other freshman Senator.

Young planned to vote in support of certifying the Electoral College count on January 6, 2021. Young also said he supported efforts to create a bipartisan "Election Integrity Committee" to review the 2020 presidential election. While entering the US Capitol to participate in the certification on January 6, 2021, Young was accosted by pro-Trump protestors. He was questioned as to why he would vote to support the count, claiming voter fraud. Young explained that "When it comes to the law, our opinions don’t matter — the law matters." The South Bend Tribune's editorial board wrote "Young was right to reject the move that Braun had embraced — but his words should have come two months earlier, not at the last minute. That would have been upholding his duty and fulfilling his oath of office." Young, however, publicly acknowledged Biden as President-elect immediately following the official Electoral College tally on December 15, 2020. He was participating in the count when the storming of the Capitol happened. Upon the storming, Young tweeted "This is not a peaceful protest – it is violence and reprehensible. It must stop." Young then voted in support of certifying the count when Congress was able to return to session. In the wake of the attack, Young would not comment on if he supported using the Twenty-fifth Amendment to the United States Constitution to remove Trump, stating that he trusted the Vice President and Trump cabinet members to "conscientiously and legally carry out their duties until Jan. 20."

In 2022, Young cosponsored, with Democratic Senate Majority Leader Chuck Schumer (NY), the CHIPS and Science Act, a $280 billion bill intended to promote basic and advanced technology research and development, with a focus on the American semiconductor industry, aiming to outcompete China in technological fields in the coming years. Young had also been involved in stalled efforts along similar lines on a bill known as United States Innovation and Competition Act in 2021. The CHIPS and Science Act passed the Senate on July 27, 2022, and was signed into law by Joe Biden on August 9, 2022.

Since the start of the 118th Congress in January 2023, Young has occupied the Senate Candy Desk, replacing retired Senator Pat Toomey (R-PA).

Committee assignments
 Committee on Commerce, Science, and Transportation
Subcommittee on Communications, Technology, Innovation, and the Internet
Subcommittee on Manufacturing, Trade and Consumer Protection
Subcommittee on Security
Subcommittee on Transportation and Safety
 Committee on Foreign Relations
Subcommittee on State Department and USAID Management, International Operations, and Bilateral International Development
Subcommittee on East Asia, the Pacific, and International Cybersecurity Policy
Subcommittee on Multilateral International Development, Multilateral Institutions, and International Economic, Energy and Environmental Policy (Chair)
 Committee on Finance
Subcommittee on Health Care
Subcommittee on International Trade, Customs, and Global Competitiveness
Subcommittee on Social Security, Pensions, and Family Policy
 Committee on Small Business and Entrepreneurship

Caucus memberships
Republican Main Street Partnership

Political positions
Young is a member of Republican Main Street Partnership, a group that presents what it describes as centrist Republican solutions in politics; it is considered a center to center-right Republican organization. He has a lifetime conservative grade of 83% from the American Conservative Union. He was given a 0% grade in 2016 by the progressive Americans for Democratic Action. The American Conservative Union, a fiscally conservative political action committee, has given Young a 80% lifetime rating. As of April 2020, according to Five ThirtyEight, Young voted with President Trump's position on legislation about 84% of the time. The nonpartisan National Journal determined, based on its 2013 voting analysis, that Young has a composite 69% conservative score and a 31% liberal score.

Abortion and reproductive issues 
Young opposes abortion. He was endorsed by the National Right to Life Committee (NRLC), which gave him a 100% rating in 2018; he has a 0% rating from the abortion rights groups NARAL Pro-Choice America and Planned Parenthood. Young also believes that employers with religious objections should not be required to provide birth control to their female employees. He was a co-sponsor of legislation to defund Planned Parenthood and voted to prohibit federal funding for Planned Parenthood. Young believes Roe v. Wade was wrongly decided. On the day the 2022 overturning of Roe v. Wade was announced, he called it "a monumental day for the protection of life in America" and that the Supreme Court had "corrected a historic injustice."

Gun law
The National Rifle Association (NRA) endorsed Young for Senate in 2016 and has given him an "A+" rating. In 2018, Gun Owners of America, a gun rights organization, gave Young a 50% score while the NRA gave him a much higher 100% rating.

Young voted to pass the Bipartisan Safer Communities Act in June 2022.

Immigration 
Young opposes the DREAM Act and a pathway to citizenship for the nearly 12 million undocumented immigrants in the United States. NumbersUSA, which wants to restrict and reduce immigration, has given him a lifetime 80% rating while the Federation for American Immigration Reform, which also seeks to restrict immigration, gave him a 100% score; the American Immigration Lawyers Association, which supports immigration reform, gave Young a 33% rating. UnidosUS, formerly La Raza, which supports immigration reform, gave Young a 59% rating in 2014. Young has said he wants an immigration system based on merit and job skills. In 2018, he introduced a bill cosponsored with Senator Ted Cruz to end family separations at the border that resulted from President Trump's "zero tolerance" policy.

LGBT rights 
The organization On the Issues considers Young to be neutral on the issue of same-sex marriage; he was given a 30% rating by Human Rights Campaign (HRC), which supports same-sex marriage and gay rights, indicating a mixed record. In 2016, the HRC gave him a 2% rating. Young believes same-sex marriage should be left to the states to decide. He said that he supports the current policy allowing gays and lesbians to serve openly in the military. In 2016, Young was among the Republicans who voted with Democrats in favor of a spending amendment to uphold President Obama's executive order prohibiting discrimination based on sexual orientation for federal contractors. He was one of 30 Republicans who voted for an amendment to prohibit discrimination by federal contractors, but voted against a similar amendment in a military spending bill. In 2022, he was one of 12 Republicans voting to advance the Respect for Marriage Act, legislation to codify same-sex marriage into federal law.

Supreme Court 

On October 6, 2018, Young voted to confirm Brett Kavanaugh to the United States Supreme Court.

In March 2019, Young was one of twelve senators to cosponsor a resolution that would impose a constitutional amendment limiting the Supreme Court to nine justices. The resolution was introduced following multiple Democratic presidential candidates expressing openness to the idea of expanding the seats on the Supreme Court.

Foreign policy 
In July 2017, Young voted in favor of the Countering America's Adversaries Through Sanctions Act that placed sanctions against Russia together with Iran and North Korea.

Young supported an Anti-Boycott Act, which would make it illegal for U.S. companies to engage in boycotts against Israel and Israeli settlements in the West Bank.

Young condemned the genocide of the Rohingya Muslim minority in Myanmar and called for a stronger response to the crisis.

In February 2019, Young was one of seven senators to reintroduce legislation requiring sanctions on Saudi officials involved in the killing of Jamal Khashoggi and seeking to address support for the Yemen civil war through prohibiting some weapons sales to Saudi Arabia and U.S. military refueling of Saudi coalition planes. In May 2019, he was also one of seven Republicans who attempted to override President Trump's veto of the resolution regarding Yemen. In June 2019, Young was one of seven Republicans to vote to block President Trump's Saudi arms deal providing weapons to Saudi Arabia, United Arab Emirates and Jordan, and was one of six Republicans to vote against an additional 20 arms sales. In 2020, he was one of eight Republicans who voted with Democrats for a resolution limiting the president's ability to strike Iran.

In 2021, Young introduced bipartisan legislation with Senator Tim Kaine that would repeal the 1991 and 2002 authorizations of war, which have been used by the executive to wage prolonged conflict in the Middle-East without congressional approval.

In 2023, Young visit Taiwan from January 16-18, as part of a larger visit to the Indo-Pacific region.  Young met with Taiwan President, senior leaders and private sector representatives to discuss U.S.-Taiwan relations, regional security, trade and investment, global supply chains, and other significant issues of mutual interest.

2021 storming of the United States Capitol
On May 28, 2021, Young voted against creating an independent commission to investigate the 2021 United States Capitol attack.

Personal life
Todd Young and Jennifer Tucker, niece of former vice-president Dan Quayle, married in 2005. The couple has four children.

As of 2018, according to OpenSecrets.org, Young's net worth was negative, owing more than $1.3 million.

Electoral history

U.S. House of Representatives

U.S. Senate

References

External links
 Senator Todd Young official U.S. Senate website
 Todd Young for Senate official campaign website
 
 
 

|-

|-

|-

|-

|-

1972 births
Living people
21st-century American politicians
Alumni of the School of Advanced Study
Carmel High School (Indiana) alumni
Federalist Society members
Indiana lawyers
Indiana University Robert H. McKinney School of Law alumni
Military personnel from Indiana
People from Hamilton County, Indiana
People from Marion County, Indiana
People from Orange County, Indiana
Politicians from Bloomington, Indiana
Republican Party United States senators from Indiana
United States Marine Corps officers
United States Naval Academy alumni
University of Chicago Booth School of Business alumni
Republican Party members of the United States House of Representatives from Indiana